Nicolae Cristea (born 11 October 1942) is a Romanian wrestler. He competed in the men's freestyle 57 kg at the 1968 Summer Olympics.

References

External links
 

1942 births
Living people
Romanian male sport wrestlers
Olympic wrestlers of Romania
Wrestlers at the 1968 Summer Olympics
Place of birth missing (living people)